William "Vilim" Feller (July 7, 1906 – January 14, 1970), born Vilibald Srećko Feller, was a Croatian-American mathematician specializing in probability theory.

Early life and education
Feller was born in Zagreb to Ida Oemichen-Perc, a Croatian-Austrian Catholic, and Eugen Viktor Feller, son of a Polish-Jewish father (David Feller) and an Austrian mother (Elsa Holzer).

Eugen Feller was a famous chemist and created Elsa fluid named after his mother. According to Gian-Carlo Rota, Eugen Feller's surname was a "Slavic tongue twister", which William changed at the age of twenty. This claim appears to be false. His forename, Vilibald, was chosen by his Catholic mother for the saint day of his birthday.

Work

Feller held a docent position at the University of Kiel beginning in 1928. Because he refused to sign a Nazi oath, he fled the Nazis and went to Copenhagen, Denmark in 1933. He also lectured in Sweden (Stockholm and Lund). As a refugee in Sweden, Feller reported being troubled by increasing fascism at the universities. He reported that the mathematician Torsten Carleman would offer his opinion that Jews and foreigners should be executed.

Finally, in 1939 he arrived in the U.S. where he became a citizen in 1944 and was on the faculty at Brown and Cornell. In 1950 he became a professor at Princeton University.

The works of Feller are contained in 104 papers and two books on a variety of topics such as mathematical analysis, theory of measurement, functional analysis, geometry, and differential equations in addition to his work in mathematical statistics and probability.

Feller was one of the greatest probabilists of the twentieth century, who is remembered for his championing of probability theory as a branch of mathematical analysis in Sweden and the United States. In the middle of the 20th century, probability theory was popular in France and Russia, while mathematical statistics was more popular in the United Kingdom and the United States, according to the Swedish statistician, Harald Cramér. His two-volume textbook on probability theory and its applications was called "the most successful treatise on probability ever written" by Gian-Carlo Rota.  By stimulating his colleagues and students in Sweden and then in the United States, Feller helped establish research groups studying the analytic theory of probability. In his research, Feller contributed to the study of the relationship between Markov chains and differential equations, where his theory of generators of one-parameter semigroups of stochastic processes gave rise to the theory of "Feller operators".

Results
Numerous topics relating to probability are named after him, including  Feller processes, Feller's explosion test, Feller–Brown movement,  and the Lindeberg–Feller theorem. Feller made fundamental contributions to renewal theory, Tauberian theorems, random walks, diffusion processes, and the law of the iterated logarithm. Feller was among those early editors who launched the journal Mathematical Reviews.

Notable books
 An Introduction to Probability Theory and its Applications, Volume I, 3rd edition (1968); 1st edn. (1950); 2nd edn. (1957)
 An Introduction to Probability Theory and its Applications, Volume II, 2nd edition (1971)

Recognition
Feller was elected to the American Academy of Arts and Sciences in 1958, the United States National Academy of Sciences in 1960, and the American Philosophical Society in 1966. Feller won the National Medal of Science in 1969.
He was president of the Institute of Mathematical Statistics.

In 1949, he was named a Fellow of the American Statistical Association. He was elected to the National Academy of Sciences in 1980.

See also
Feller condition
Beta distribution
Compound Poisson distribution
Gillespie algorithm
Kolmogorov equations
Poisson point process
Stability (probability)
St. Petersburg paradox
Stochastic process

References

External links

 
 A biographical memoir by Murray Rosenblatt
 Croatian Giants of Science - in Croatian
 
 "Fine Hall in its golden age: Remembrances of Princeton in the early fifties" by Gian-Carlo Rota. Contains a section on Feller at Princeton.
 Feller Matriculation Form giving personal details

1906 births
1970 deaths
20th-century American mathematicians
20th-century Croatian people
Croatian mathematicians
Presidents of the Institute of Mathematical Statistics
Probability theorists
Brown University faculty
Cornell University faculty
Princeton University faculty
University of Göttingen alumni
Faculty of Science, University of Zagreb alumni
National Medal of Science laureates
Croatian refugees
American people of Polish-Jewish descent
Croatian Austro-Hungarians
Croatian people of Austrian descent
Croatian people of Polish-Jewish descent
Scientists from Zagreb
Yugoslav emigrants to the United States
Members of the United States National Academy of Sciences
Fellows of the American Statistical Association
Members of the American Philosophical Society